Siah Golvandan (also Romanized as Sīāh Golvandān and Sīāh Golvandān; also known as Seklemandan, Sīāh Galūbandān-e Bālā, Sīāh Galūbandān-e Pā’īn, Sīāh Golvandān-e Bālā, and Sīāh Golvandān-e Pā’īn) is a village in Lakan Rural District, in the Central District of Rasht County, Gilan Province, Iran. At the 2006 census, its population was 793, in 199 families.

References 

Populated places in Rasht County